Rajdeep Darbar (born 14 September 1987) is an Indian cricketer. He made his first-class debut for Gujarat in the 2010–11 Ranji Trophy on 1 November 2010. In June 2021, he was selected to take part in the Minor League Cricket tournament in the United States following the players' draft.

References

External links
 

1987 births
Living people
Indian cricketers
Gujarat cricketers
Saurashtra cricketers
People from Botad district